Stigmatophora rhodophila is a moth in the subfamily Arctiinae. It was described by Francis Walker in 1864. It is found in the Russian Far East (Middle Amur, Primorye), China (Heilongjiang, Beijing, Shanxi, Shandong, Jiangsu, Zhejiang, Hunan, Guangxi, Sichuan, Shaanxi), Korea and Japan.

References

Moths described in 1864
Lithosiini
Moths of Asia